The 1968 Hardy Cup was the 1968 edition of the Canadian intermediate senior ice hockey championship. The 1967-68 season was the first season of the Hardy Cup, which was awarded by the Canadian Amateur Hockey Association between 1968 and 1990.

The winners of the 1968 Cup were the Sept-Îles Mineurs, a hockey team based in Sept-Îles, Quebec. In the final, they beat the Meadow Lake Stampeders from Saskatchewan 3-1.

To reach the final, the Mineurs had won the Eastern Canadian championship by beating Kapuskasing, while Meadow Lake had won the Western  Canadian championship by beating Fort Frances.

Hardy Cup final 

Sept-Îles wins the series 3-1.

Eastern Canada Championship 1968

Teams

Playdowns

Western Canada Championship 1968

Teams

Playdowns

Sept-Îles Mineurs 1968 Roster
Management: Jean Croteau, Arthur Levesque, Lucien Ruest.
Coach: Jean-Guy Normand.

Hardy Cup
Hardy Cup